The 2008 Texas Bowl was the third edition of the college football bowl game, and was played at Reliant Stadium in Houston, Texas.  The game was played at 7:00 PM US CST on Tuesday, December 30, 2008. The game, telecast on NFL Network, featured the hometown Rice Owls against the Western Michigan Broncos.  The Owls won the game 38-14, which was their first post-season victory since the 1954 Cotton Bowl Classic.

The game was televised on the NFL Network for the third year in a row. Fran Charles, Tom Waddle, and Kara Henderson called the action.

Game summary

Scoring

Statistics

Source:

References

External links
 Game summary at ESPN
 Official Texas Bowl website via Wayback Machine

Western Michigan Broncos football bowl games
Rice Owls football bowl games
Texas Bowl
Texas Bowl
Texas Bowl
Texas Bowl
Texas Bowl